Benjamin Tackie (born 23 July 1973) is a Ghanaian professional boxer and world title challenger. He is known for his excellent chin and ability to throw a high volume of punches. All but one of his losses have come via decision.

Professional career 
Known as "Wonder", Tackie turned pro in 1994 and won his first 18 fights before losing a decision to Gregorio Vargas in 1999. In 2002, he took on Kostya Tszyu for the unified WBC, WBA and IBF light welterweight titles but lost a decision. He lost his next two fights to Sharmba Mitchell and Ricky Hatton. He lost to Matthew Hatton on 22 September 2008 on the undercard to Ricky Hatton's Light Welterweight title defence in Las Vegas.

Tackie's 10th-round knockout of Robert Garcia was named Ring Magazine Knockout of the Year for 2000.

So far in his 41 pro fights Tackie has been knocked down only once.

Stalking charge 

In February 2015, Tackie's stalking conviction was reversed in Bronx county court in New York. The threat communicated "Don't let me use my boxing skills on you" apparently did not rise to the legal requirement to uphold his conviction.
http://law.justia.com/cases/new-york/other-courts/2015/2015-ny-slip-op-50117-u.html

Statistics 
As of April 2009, Tackie's record stands at 29–11–1 with 17 knockouts.

References

External links 
 

1973 births
Living people
Ghanaian male boxers
Welterweight boxers
Boxers from Accra
Ga-Adangbe people
African Boxing Union champions